Phetsuphan Por.Daorungruang is a Thai Muay Thai fighter.

Titles and accomplishments
Rajadamnern Stadium
 2017 Rajadamnern Stadium 115 lbs Champion (Defended 4 times)
International Federation of Muaythai Associations
 2021 IFMA World Championships -51 kg

Fight record

|-  style="background:#fbb;"
| 2023-02-24|| Loss ||align=left| Mangkornlek Peinakhon  || Muaymunwansuk, Rangsit Stadium || Pathum Thani, Thailand || Decision || 5 || 3:00 

|-  style="background:#fbb;"
| 2023-01-07|| Loss ||align=left| Kraduklek Kor.Klumkliaew  || Muayded Sangweindeud, Or.Tor.Gor.3 Stadium|| Nonthaburi, Thailand || KO || 2 ||  

|-  style="background:#fbb;"
| 2022-11-12|| Loss ||align=left| Petchseeta KobwasaduphantPhuket  || Muay Thai Vithee Tin Thai + Petchyindee Sanjorn || Chiang Rai, Thailand || Decision || 5 || 3:00 

|-  style="background:#fbb;"
| 2022-09-27|| Loss ||align=left| Padetsuek SorJor.TongPrachin  || Onesongchai || Phetchabun province, Thailand || Decision || 5 || 3:00  
|-
! style=background:white colspan=9 |
|-  style="background:#fbb;"
| 2022-08-20|| Loss ||align=left| YodUdon Or.UdUdon || Jitmuangnon Superfight, Or.Tor.Gor3 Stadium || Nonthaburi province, Thailand || Decision|| 5 ||3:00  

|-  style="background:#cfc;"
| 2022-07-24|| Win ||align=left| Nompraew Tor.RatchatanGym  || Muaydee Vitheethai + Jitmuangnon, Or.Tor.Gor.3 Stadium|| Nonthaburi, Thailand || Decision || 5 || 3:00 

|-  style="background:#fbb;"
| 2022-05-01|| Loss ||align=left| Songchainoi Kiatsongrit  || SuekMahachon Onesongchai || Kamphaeng Phet, Thailand || Decision|| 5 ||3:00  
|-
! style=background:white colspan=9 |

|-  style="background:#cfc;"
| 2022-02-27|| Win ||align=left| Sunday Chaiyaigym  || Muaydee Vitheethai + Jitmuangnon, Or.Tor.Gor.3 Stadium|| Nonthaburi, Thailand || Decision || 5 || 3:00 

|-  style="background:#fbb;"
| 2022-01-09|| Loss||align=left| Nuathoranee Jitmuangnon  || Muaydee Vitheethai + Jitmuangnon, Or.Tor.Gor3 Stadium || Nonthaburi province, Thailand || Decision|| 5 || 3:00 
|-
! style=background:white colspan=9 |

|-  style="background:#cfc;"
| 2021-09-25|| Win ||align=left| Den Sor.PhetUdon || Lumpinee GoSport, Lumpinee Stadium|| Bangkok, Thailand || Decision || 5 || 3:00 

|-  style="background:#fbb;"
| 2021-04-05|| Loss||align=left| Oleylek Sor.Kaenjai  || Chef Boontham, Rangsit Stadium || Rangsit, Thailand || Decision || 5 || 3:00
|-  style="background:#fbb;"
| 2020-10-10|| Loss||align=left| Phetsomjit Jitmuangnon  || Jitmuangnon + Sor.KafeMuayThai, Or.Tor.Gor 3 Stadium || Nonthaburi, Thailand || Decision || 5 || 3:00
|-  style="background:#fbb;"
| 2020-09-12|| Loss ||align=left| Phetsomjit Jitmuangnon  || Yodmuay Onesongchai, Thanakorn Stadium || Nakhon Pathom, Thailand || Decision || 5 || 3:00
|-  style="background:#fbb;"
| 2020-08-11|| Loss ||align=left| Phetsommai Sor.Sommai  || Chef Boontham, Thanakorn Stadium || Nakhon Pathom Province, Thailand ||Decision ||5 ||3:00
|-  style="background:#fbb;"
| 2020-01-30|| Loss ||align=left| Kongchai Chanaidonmuang || Rajadamnern Stadium || Bangkok, Thailand || Decision || 5 || 3:00 
|-
! style=background:white colspan=9 |
|-  style="background:#cfc;"
| 2019-12-19|| Win||align=left| Phetsomjit Jitmuangnon  ||  Rajadamnern Stadium || Bangkok, Thailand || Decision || 5 || 3:00 
|-
! style=background:white colspan=9 |
|-  style="background:#cfc;"
| 2019-11-25|| Win||align=left| Raktemroi 13coinstower ||  Rajadamnern Stadium || Bangkok, Thailand || Decision || 5 || 3:00
|-  style="background:#fbb;"
| 2019-10-17|| Loss||align=left| Puenkon Tor.Surat || Rajadamnern Stadium || Bangkok, Thailand || Decision || 5 || 3:00
|-  style="background:#cfc;"
| 2019-09-15|| Win||align=left| Priewpak SorJor.Vichitmuangpadriew || Blue Arena || Samut Prakan, Thailand || Decision || 5 || 3:00
|-  style="background:#fbb;"
| 2019-06-06|| Loss||align=left| Kumandoi Petcharoenvit || Rajadamnern Stadium || Bangkok, Thailand || KO (Head Kick) || 2 ||
|-  style="background:#cfc;"
| 2019-03-28|| Win ||align=left| Phetsommai Sor.Sommai || Rajadamnern Stadium ||Bangkok, Thailand || Decision || 5 || 3:00
|-  style="background:#cfc;"
| 2019-02-11|| Win||align=left| Wanmawin Pumpanmuang  ||  Rajadamnern Stadium || Bangkok, Thailand || Decision || 5 || 3:00 
|-
! style=background:white colspan=9 |
|-  style="background:#cfc;"
| 2018-12-27|| Win||align=left| Raktemroi SorJor.Vichitmuangpadriew ||  Rajadamnern Stadium || Bangkok, Thailand || Decision || 5 || 3:00
|-  style="background:#cfc;"
| 2018-12-06|| Win||align=left| Puenkon Tor.Surat || Rajadamnern Stadium || Bangkok, Thailand || Decision || 5 || 3:00
|-  style="background:#cfc;"
| 2018-11-01|| Win||align=left| Raktemroi SorJor.Vichitmuangpadriew ||  Rajadamnern Stadium || Bangkok, Thailand || Decision || 5 || 3:00
|-  style="background:#cfc;"
| 2018-09-20|| Win||align=left| Kongmuangtrang Kaewsamrit  ||  Rajadamnern Stadium || Bangkok, Thailand || Decision || 5 || 3:00 
|-
! style=background:white colspan=9 |
|-  style="background:#fbb;"
| 2018-08-30|| Loss ||align=left| Konkorn Kiatphontip  ||  Rajadamnern Stadium || Bangkok, Thailand || Decision || 5 || 3:00
|-  style="background:#cfc;"
| 2018-08-06|| Win||align=left| Priewpak SorJor.Vichitpaedriw  ||  Rajadamnern Stadium || Bangkok, Thailand || Decision || 5 || 3:00
|-  style="background:#fbb;"
| 2018-07-05|| Loss ||align=left| Rungnarai Kiatmuu9 || Rajadamnern Stadium || Bangkok, Thailand || Decision || 5 || 3:00
|-  style="background:#cfc;"
| 2018-06-06|| Win ||align=left| Kumandoi Petcharoenvit || Rajadamnern Stadium || Bangkok, Thailand ||Decision || 5 || 3:00
|-  style="background:#cfc;"
| 2018-05-03|| Win ||align=left| Konkorn Kiatphontip  ||  Rajadamnern Stadium || Bangkok, Thailand || Decision || 5 || 3:00
|-  style="background:#fbb;"
| 2018-04-02|| Loss||align=left| Kumandoi Petcharoenvit || Rajadamnern Stadium || Bangkok, Thailand ||Decision || 5 || 3:00
|-  style="background:#cfc;"
| 2018-03-05|| Win ||align=left| Kumandoi Petcharoenvit || Rajadamnern Stadium || Bangkok, Thailand ||Decision (Unanimous) || 5 || 3:00 
|-
! style=background:white colspan=9 |
|-  style="background:#cfc;"
| 2018-01-24|| Win ||align=left| Fahmongkhol Taembangsai || Rajadamnern Stadium || Bangkok, Thailand || KO|| 4 ||  
|-
! style=background:white colspan=9 |
|-  style="background:#cfc;"
| 2017-11-28|| Win ||align=left| Nong Rose Barnjaroensuk || Rajadamnern Stadium || Bangkok, Thailand || Decision || 5 || 3:00
|-  style="background:#cfc;"
| 2017-11-02|| Win ||align=left| Nong Rose Barnjaroensuk || Rajadamnern Stadium || Bangkok, Thailand || Decision || 5 || 3:00 
|-
! style=background:white colspan=9 |
|-  style="background:#cfc;"
| 2017-09-09|| Win ||align=left| Daoroht Jitmuangnon || Omnoi Stadium || Samut Sakhon, Thailand || Decision || 5 || 3:00
|-  style="background:#fbb;"
| 2017-07-24|| Loss ||align=left| Sanpetch Numsaenggorsang || Rajadamnern Stadium || Bangkok, Thailand || Decision || 5 || 3:00
|-  style="background:#cfc;"
| 2017-06-15|| Win ||align=left| Wittayalek Moosapanmai  || Rajadamnern Stadium || Bangkok, Thailand || Decision || 5 || 3:00
|-  style="background:#fbb;"
| 2017-04-30|| Loss ||align=left| Ngapayak Or.Bor.Tor.Nonetong  || Rangsit Stadium || Rangsit, Thailand || Decision || 5 || 3:00
|-  style="background:#fbb;"
| 2017-03-25|| Loss ||align=left| Phetmuangchon Por.Suantong || Montri Studio || Rangsit, Thailand || KO || 3 ||
|-  style="background:#cfc;"
| 2017-01-30|| Win ||align=left| Petchsamret OrBorTor.Nongyangtoy || Rajadamnern Stadium || Bangkok, Thailand || KO || 3||
|-  style="background:#fbb;"
| 2017-01-07|| Loss ||align=left| Denmechai Tedsabanbansong || Montri Studio || Rangsit, Thailand || Decision || 5 || 3:00
|-  style="background:#fbb;"
| 2016-11-30|| Loss ||align=left| Gingsanglek Tor.Laksong|| Rajadamnern Stadium || Bangkok, Thailand || TKO (Su mai dai) || 4||
|-  style="background:#fbb;"
| 2016-06-22|| Loss ||align=left| Phetpangan Mor.Ratanabandit || Rajadamnern Stadium ||Bangkok, Thailand || Decision || 5 || 3:00
|-  style="background:#cfc;"
| 2016-05-03|| Win ||align=left| Kaito Wor.Wanchai || Suk Daurung Yutahatti ||Suphan Buri Province, Thailand || Decision || 5 || 3:00
|-  style="background:#fbb;"
| 2016-03-31|| Loss ||align=left| Phetmuangchon Por.Suantong || Rajadamnern Stadium ||Bangkok, Thailand || Decision || 5 || 3:00
|-  style="background:#cfc;"
| 2016-02-24|| Win||align=left| Sayanlek Sayangym || Montri Studio ||Bangkok, Thailand || Decision || 5 || 3:00
|-  style="background:#cfc;"
| 2015-12-16|| Win ||align=left| Tito Hoywanpotchana|| Rajadamnern Stadium ||Bangkok, Thailand || Decision || 5 || 3:00
|-  style="background:#cfc;"
| 2015-11-21|| Win ||align=left| Senthanong Tor.Silachai || Montri Studio ||Bangkok, Thailand || Decision || 5 || 3:00
|-  style="background:#fbb;"
| 2015-10-24|| Loss ||align=left| Saenpayak Por.Jaroenphet || Montri Studio ||Bangkok, Thailand || Decision || 5 || 3:00
|-  style="background:#fbb;"
| 2015-07-29|| Loss||align=left| Sayanlek Sayangym || Rajadamnern Stadium ||Bangkok, Thailand || KO || 3 ||
|-  style="background:#cfc;"
| 2015-06-24|| Win ||align=left| Senthanong Tor.Silachai || Rajadamnern Stadium ||Bangkok, Thailand || Decision || 5 || 3:00
|-  style="background:#cfc;"
| 2015-05-27|| Win ||align=left| Chok Phor.Pat || Rajadamnern Stadium ||Bangkok, Thailand || KO || 3 ||
|-  style="background:#fbb;"
| 2015-04-27|| Loss||align=left| Chok Phor.Pat || Rajadamnern Stadium ||Bangkok, Thailand || Decision || 5 || 3:00
|-  style="background:#fbb;"
| 2015-03-19|| Loss||align=left| Ngapayak Or.Bor.Tor.Nonetong || Rajadamnern Stadium ||Bangkok, Thailand || Decision || 5 || 3:00
|-  style="background:#cfc;"
| 2015-02-09|| Win ||align=left| Senthanong Tor.Silachai || Rajadamnern Stadium ||Bangkok, Thailand || Decision || 5 || 3:00
|-  style="background:#fbb;"
| 2014-12-31|| Loss||align=left| Phetmuangchon Por.Suantong || Rajadamnern Stadium ||Bangkok, Thailand || Decision || 5 || 3:00
|-  style="background:#cfc;"
| 2014-10-23|| Win ||align=left| Sueayai Chor.Haphayak || Rajadamnern Stadium ||Bangkok, Thailand || KO || 3 ||
|-
| colspan=9 | Legend:    

|-  style="background:#cfc;"
| 2021-12-11|| Win ||align=left| Sheikh Samil Omer Kalhan  || IFMA World Championships 2021, Final || Bangkok, Thailand || Decision ||  || 
|-
! style=background:white colspan=9 |
|-  style="background:#cfc;"
| 2021-12-10|| Win ||align=left| Ovsep Aslanyan  || IFMA World Championships 2021, Semi Final || Bangkok, Thailand || Decision ||  || 

|-  style="background:#cfc;"
| 2021-12-09|| Win ||align=left| Pynnehbor Mylliemngap || IFMA World Championships 2021, Quarter Final || Bangkok, Thailand || TKO||  || 
|-
| colspan=9 | Legend:

References

Phetsuphan Por.Daorungruang
Living people
1992 births